Fruit trees are grown in a variety of shapes, sometimes to please the eye but mainly to encourage fruit production. The form or shape of fruit trees can be manipulated by pruning and training. Shaping and promoting a particular tree form is done to establish the plant in a particular situation under certain environmental conditions, to increase fruit yield, and to enhance fruit quality. For example, pruning a tree to a pyramid shape enables trees to be planted closer together. An open bowl or cup form helps sunlight penetrate the canopy, thus encouraging a high fruit yield whilst keeping the tree short and accessible for harvesting. Other shapes such as cordons, espaliers and fans offer opportunities for growing trees two dimensionally against walls or fences, or they can be trained to function as barriers.

Forms

Some of the following fruit tree forms require training by tying the branches to the required form. Most require pruning to retain the desired structure. However, not all types of fruit tree are suitable for all forms; apples and pears do well as cordons and espaliers, for example, whereas cherries are more suited to the fan form.

Bush
This is a traditional and popular form for apple trees. Bush trees are easy to maintain and bear fruit at a young age.

Standard
They eventually produce high yields but, being large trees, are not easy to maintain.

Pyramid
Similar to the bush form, although the main leader shoot is allowed to maintain its dominance, resulting in a pyramidal shape.

Spindlebush
A variant of the pyramid form in which the lateral branches are tied down to a horizontal position. 
Designed for dense orchards by Otto Schmitz-Hübsch and Heinrichs in Germany in 1936, this is currently the most popular training system for dwarf apple and pear trees.

Cordon
Single-stemmed trees planted at an angle (usually 45°), with fruiting spurs encouraged to form along the stem. Any side branches are removed by pruning. Cordons take less space and crop earlier than most other forms, so more varieties can be grown in a given space, but yields are smaller per tree. A special cordon set-up is the Bouché-Thomas system.

Espalier
A central vertical trunk with three or four horizontal branches on each side. A special espalier in this group is the LePage-system.

Fan
A short central trunk with several radiating branches growing from the crown.

Step-over espalier
Espaliers with just one tier of horizontal branches 30 cm from the ground. These make a novel and productive border for a vegetable plot.

A study on orchard mango trees in Nelspruit, South Africa, compared open vase, closed vase, central leader, palmette and standard pruning systems and recommended a modified pyramid, somewhere between a central leader and a closed vase system, for high-density mango orchards. The study also evaluated both post-fruit-set and post-harvest pruning, indicating that late mango cultivars benefit from pruning while bearing in late fall, while early cultivars may be best pruned immediately after harvest.

Yield and spacing

Images

See also
 Fruit tree pollination
 Fruit tree propagation
 Orchards
 Pruning fruit trees
 Tree shaping

References

Books and publications

 Burvenich, Frederik (1879). Snoei der Fruitbomen.

Forms
Horticultural techniques
Agronomy